The Plainsman is a 1966 American Western film directed by David Lowell Rich and starring Don Murray and Guy Stockwell. It's a remake of the 1936 Cecil B. DeMille film of the same name.

Plot
After being taken prisoner by Crazy Knife and a band of Cheyenne warriors, Wild Bill Hickok's life is spared by Chief Black Kettle, but when he is set free, it is without his horse and his boots.

Calamity Jane, driving a stagecoach, gives Hickok a ride back to the fort, where Lt. Stiles of the Army seems indifferent to Hickok's warning that the Cheyenne are now armed with repeating rifles. At the saloon, where Wild Bill renews an acquaintance with old friend Buffalo Bill, he spots a gambler named Lattimer cheating at poker and deals with him accordingly.

Crazy Knife and his men take Calamity Jane captive, and Lattimer turns out to be the one supplying them with the rifles. Hickok manages to save Jane, who loves him, and the fort ends up with a new officer in command, General Custer.

Cast
 Don Murray as Wild Bill Hickok
 Guy Stockwell as Buffalo Bill Cody 
 Abby Dalton as Calamity Jane
 Bradford Dillman as Lieutenant Stiles
 Henry Silva as Crazy Knife
 Simon Oakland as Chief Black Kettle 
 Leslie Nielsen as Colonel George Armstrong Custer 
 Ed Binns as Lattimer
 Michael Evans as Estrick 
 Percy Rodrigues as Brother John 
 Terry Wilson as Sergeant Womack
 Walter Burke as Abe Ireland
 Emily Banks as Louisa Cody

See also
 List of American films of 1966

External links
 
 
 
 

1966 films
1966 Western (genre) films
American Western (genre) films
Remakes of American films
Cultural depictions of Buffalo Bill
Cultural depictions of Calamity Jane
Cultural depictions of George Armstrong Custer
Cultural depictions of Wild Bill Hickok
1960s English-language films
Films directed by David Lowell Rich
Films scored by John Williams
Universal Pictures films
1960s American films